County routes in the U.S. state of California are controlled and maintained by the respective counties in which they are located. However, they are generally patrolled by the state's California Highway Patrol. They are typically major thoroughfares in rural areas, although many run through urban areas as well. Most are two-lane highways, and can accommodate high speeds and large volumes of traffic.

County routes are typically designated with a letter (A, B, D, E, G, J, N, R, or S, depending on the region of the state, with several counties split between two region prefixes) followed by a number (example: G2). Therefore, the county routes are sorted alphabetically, from the northernmost region of California to the southernmost region. Routes with letters (A, B, D) are in the region of Northern California, letters (E, G, J) are in Central California, and (N, R, S) are in Southern California.  Routes in Lake and San Bernardino Counties are designated by numbers only.

The level of signage varies by county. In San Diego County, reassurance markers are placed as frequently as they would be on state highways. In other counties, some county routes are completely unsigned. For most county routes, signage may be found at the beginning and end and at major junctions; reassurance markers are rare and are placed at distant intervals. With a handful of exceptions (one example being S2), county routes are typically referred to by their street name (e.g. Angeles Forest Highway or Kanan Dume Road) rather than their route designation.

These routes are all part of the California Route Marker Program, which was established in 1958. This program was incorporated into the National Uniform County Route Marker Program created by the National Association of Counties in 1967. Not all counties choose to use the same marker; some have different systems of numbering their county routes. Lake County maintains  of county roads, which are not listed here.


List
The county routes are alphabetically sorted by the prefix letter in its shield, followed by the corresponding number.

See also

References

External links
CAHighways.org

 
Lists of roads in California